Ha Jun (born Song Joon-Chul on 3 April 1987), also known by his ex-stage name Song Ha-jun, is a South Korean actor.

Filmography

Film

Television series

Theater

Awards and nominations

References

External links 
 

1987 births
Living people
South Korean male film actors
South Korean male television actors